Ceville is a humorous graphic adventure video game developed by the German game studio Realmforge Studios and published by Kalypso Media. Despite the game's use of 3D environments and models, the gameplay is very true to the graphical point-and-click adventure tradition of gameplay, immortalized by game series like Monkey Island from LucasArts and the King's Quest series from Sierra Online.

Plot
The evil and sarcastic tyrant King Ceville is thrown from power by an angry mob and must find a way to reclaim the crown of the fantasy realm Faeryanis. Together with his sidekick Lilly he travels all over the land and encounters a variety of odd and lovable characters including a Dark Knight who smokes too much and The Good Fairy (character from the classic folk tale Cinderella) who runs a rehabilitation clinic for former archvillains.

Reception
Nowgamer praised the game as resembling Monkey Island and for being a step in the revival of adventure games.
The game was criticized for having a few technical issues, most notably a habit of crashing for no obvious reason. The Norwegian radio program Hardcore praised the game in its review for its elegance and charm.
German Gamestar Magazine gave 86% and two Awards, PC Games 80% and PC Action 81%. Gamestar Hungary rating is 83%. IGN gave the game a triumphant 9.0 grade. IT Reviews hailed it as "a welcome return to the Golden Age of animated adventure gaming."

See also
Monkey Island series
Runaway: A Twist of Fate

References

External links
Official Ceville website at Kalypso Media
Kalypso Media Official website

2009 video games
Adventure games
Point-and-click adventure games
Fantasy video games
Focus Entertainment games
Video games developed in Germany
Windows games